The Netball World Cup Sydney 2015 (NWC2015) was the 14th edition of the INF Netball World Cup, the premier competition in international netball. It was held from 7–16 August, in Sydney, Australia, which secured hosting rights after defeating a rival bid from Manchester, England. Matches were played at Allphones Arena and Netball Central. Sixteen nations competed at the championships, including the top six teams from the 2011 World Netball Championships in Singapore.  After two rounds in which teams competed in pools of four, Australia, New Zealand, England and Jamaica contested the semi-finals.  Australia defended its 2011 title against New Zealand by a narrow 58–55 victory. The final at Allphones Arena was attended by 16,752 people, a world record for any netball game. Malawian shooter Mwai Kumwenda was the player of distinction.

Organisation

Hosting rights
Bids to host the 2015 Netball World Cup were submitted to the International Netball Federation (INF) in 2010. The two candidate cities chosen were Manchester, England and Sydney, Australia. In March 2011, INF delegates convened in Singapore, host nation of the 2011 World Netball Championships, to consider both bids. At the end of the conference, Sydney was announced as the host city for the 2015 tournament.

This is the second time that Sydney hosted the competition, and the third time in Australia. Sydney last hosted the event in 1991, where Australia won a closely contested final against New Zealand.

Venues
The sixty four matches were played at the Allphones Arena and Netball Central in Sydney Olympic Park. Allphones Arena hosted the majority of the matches while Netball Central served as the official training venue for all sixteen participating teams. It also hosted pool matches, play-offs and placing games.

Broadcasters
This is a list of the broadcasters for the tournament in competing countries and regions.

Umpires
Seventeen umpires from six countries officiated matches at the tournament.

Teams

Qualification
Sixteen teams contested the 2015 tournament. The home nation automatically qualified, along with the next five highest-ranked teams from the 2011 World Netball Championships:
  (host nation)
 
 
 
 
 

Qualification Tournaments
The remaining ten teams were determined by regional qualifying tournaments, with two teams selected from each of the five international netball regions; Africa, Americas, Asia, Europe and Oceania.

Draw
There was no draw for the tournament, instead the 16 qualified teams were allocated into four pools (A, B, C and D) according to their INF World Rankings of 1 July 2014, as per following criteria:

 Pool A – teams seeded 1, 2, 9, 10
 Pool B – teams seeded 3, 4, 11, 12
 Pool C – teams seeded 5, 6, 13, 14
 Pool D – teams seeded 7, 8, 15, 16
 Subject to a maximum of two teams from the same region per pool, in case of a third team from the same region, they are switched with the closest ranked team from a different pool. After the original allocation, Sri Lanka and Uganda swapped pools to comply with this rule.

Rankings reflect the teams' rankings in July 2014.

Format
The 2015 tournament consisted of 64 matches played over ten days from 7–16 August. It included three stages – a preliminary pool stage, a qualifying pool stage, and a knockout series of semi-finals and finals. The 16 participating teams were initially divided into four pools (A, B, C and D) of four teams. During the preliminary pool stage, teams in each pool played each other once. In every pool match, two points were awarded to a winning team, while no points were given to a losing team.

The qualification round consisted of two First Eight pools (E and F), which were formed from two teams with the highest number of points in each of the preliminary matches pools, and two Second Eight pools (G and H), formed from the bottom two teams in each of the preliminary matches pools. In this stage, teams in each pool played each other once.

The two teams with the highest number of points in each of the two First Eight pools advanced to the semi-finals. The winners of the semifinals contested the final, while the losers played for the bronze medal (3rd place). The bottom two teams in each of these pools entered a knockout stage to determine fifth to eighth place. The teams from the two Second Eight pools are similarly divided, eventually entering two knockout stages for 9th to 12th place and 13th to 16th place.

Preliminary round matches

Pool A

Pool B

Pool C

Pool D

Qualification round matches

Pool E

Pool F

Pool G

Pool H

Play-off matches
5th to 8th

9th to 12th

13th to 16th

Placement matches
5th place

7th place

9th place

11th place

13th place

15th place

Semi-finals and medal matches
At the conclusion of qualifying pool play Australia, England, Jamaica and New Zealand advanced into the semi-finals. This was the fifth time in the last five tournaments that the world's top four ranked sides had reached the semi-final stage. New Zealand led England throughout the first semi-final, pulling away in the last fifteen minutes to post a 50 points to 39 win. In the other semi final Australia eased past Jamaica 67 to 56, outpointing them in three of the four-quarters.

In the final Australia outplayed New Zealand in the first quarter to lead 16–7. Despite winning each of the next three-quarters New Zealand were unable to make up the difference. Australia extended their lead to 12 goals early in the second quarter, before New Zealand played their way back into the game. At half-time the score was 30 to 22 and at the start of the last quarter 43 to 37. With a minute remaining Australia led by just three goals, but were able to hold their nerve to record a 58 to 55 goal victory.

The defensive work of captain Laura Geitz and Julie Corletto along with accurate goal shooting from Caitlin Bassett helped set up the Australian win. New Zealand goal attack Maria Tutaia said they were too complacent in the first quarter and could not handle the defensive pressure from Australia. Geitz praised her attackers for capitalising on every opportunity and also said that the "first quarter set us up nicely." The Australians shooters scored goals at a 91 percent success rate while their defenders held the New Zealanders to just 73 percent. Corletto retired after the game, ending a twelve-year career that includes 53 tests and three world titles. Australia has now won the World Cup three times in a row and eleven times in total. In the bronze medal match England beat Jamaica 66–44.

Semi-finals

Bronze medal match

Gold medal match

Final placings

Medallists

References

External links

NWC2015 website

 
2015
International netball competitions hosted by Australia
2015 in netball
2015 in Australian netball
Netball
Netball
Netball
Netball in New South Wales